ARAD, (also ÌR or NITÁ) is the capital letter-(majuscule) Sumerogram for the Akkadian language word "ardu", for servant. It is used especially in the introduction to the Pharaoh: for example "To King, Lord-mine (of Gods(pl)-mine, Sun-god-mine), message thus Xxxxxx, "Servant-yours"-(271). It is also used extensively in Amarna letter texts, the author, usually the "man of a city", (or scribe), where there is a constant reminder that he is a "servant", or "servant-yours"-(of the Pharaoh). Many letters are giving city-state status reports, but many are also requesting help with the Egyptian army troops-(Archers (Egyptian pitati), supplied by the Pharaoh).

Epic of Gilgamesh
The cuneiform character for ARAD, ÌR, and NITÁ:  in the Epic of Gilgamesh is used in the following numbers: ARAD-(2), ÌR-(2), and NITÁ-(2) times. It is used numerous times in the Amarna letters but especially from the city-states of Canaan-(Ki-Na-Ha-A-(-Ha-) in the letters-(EA 30:1, for example)).

References

Held, Schmalstieg, Gertz, 1987. Beginning Hittite. Warren H. Held, Jr, William R. Schmalstieg, Janet E. Gertz, c. 1987, Slavica Publishers, Inc. w/ Glossaries, Sign List, Indexes, etc., 218 pages.

See also
Amarna letter EA 364

Sumerian words and phrases
Sumerograms
Cuneiform signs